Two highways in the U.S. state of Nevada have been signed as Route 85:
Nevada State Route 85 (1940s)
Nevada State Route 85 (1970s)